Golobok  is a village in the municipality of Smederevska Palanka, Serbia. According to the 2002 census, the village has a population of 2396 people.

References

Populated places in Podunavlje District